Cretasergestes sahelalmaensis is an extinct species of prawn which existed in Lebanon during the Late Cretaceous period, the only species in the genus Cretasergestes.

References

Dendrobranchiata
Late Cretaceous crustaceans
Prehistoric crustacean genera
Crustaceans described in 2006
Cenomanian genera
Cretaceous Lebanon
Fossils of Lebanon
Fossil taxa described in 2006
Late Cretaceous arthropods of Asia